Jung Ji-in (born 18 July 2000) is a South Korean handball player for the Korea National Sport University and the South Korean national team.

Career
Jung began playing handball at the age of 10 and first garnered attention in 2017 when she was selected for the South Korean under-18 national team and won gold at the Asian Youth Championship. In December 2017 Jung participated in the 2017 IHF World Handball Championship at the age of 17, as the youngest member of the South Korean squad.

In 2018 Jung took part in the 2018 IHF Junior World Handball Championship and achieved bronze medal. South Korea beat Russia 29–27 and claimed the bronze medal in Hungary.

In 2019 Jung went on to enter Korea National Sport University without going directly to the club league. In December 2019 Jung got called-up to the South Korean national team again and competed in the 2019 IHF World Handball Championship.

References

2000 births
Living people
South Korean female handball players
Sportspeople from Busan
Handball players at the 2020 Summer Olympics